This is a chronological list of presidents of the Methodist Conference of the Methodist Church of Great Britain and its predecessor churches.

John Wesley, founder of Methodism, organised and presided over the first Methodist Conference, which was to become the church's governing body. This article lists his successors, who are elected by the Conference to serve a one-year term. Presidents follow Wesley's example in travelling the length and breadth of Great Britain, visiting and preaching in local Methodist chapels. Presidents also have an important role representing the Methodist Church in the wider world (most prominently, appearing at the Remembrance Sunday service at the Cenotaph in Whitehall).

The first century of British Methodism was characterised by multiple splits from the original Wesleyan Methodist Church. Other Methodist branches, such as the Primitive Methodist Church, Bible Christian Church and the Methodist New Connexion had their own conferences and presidents. The various branches were re-united in 1932.

John Wesley and the early conference 
Methodism traces its roots to the 18th-century Anglican preacher John Wesley and, to a lesser extent, his brother Charles. The Wesley brothers began an evangelical revival within the Church of England. Over time, John Wesley organised converts locally, founding Methodist "societies", organised into "circuits", and linked in a "connexion". All preachers were in were in connexion primarily with him and thence with each other. John and Charles Wesley, along with four other ministers and four lay preachers, met for consultation in London in 1744. This set a precedent for future conferences; subsequently, the annual conference became the ruling body of the Methodist movement.

In 1773, John Wesley had designated John William Fletcher to be his successor, however he outlived Fletcher. In 1784 Wesley made provision for the governance of Methodism after his death through the Yearly Conference of the People called Methodists. He nominated 100 people and declared them to be its members and laid down the method by which their successors were to be appointed.

Wesley himself was the original president of the Methodist Conference – although at the 1780 conference in Bristol, Christopher Hopper presided in Wesley's absence – but after his death it was agreed that in future, so much authority would not be placed in the hands of one man. Instead, the president would be elected for one year only, to sit in Wesley's chair.

A list of Wesley's early successors was produced by the Wesleyan Methodist Church, listing all Presidents up to 1890. The My Methodist History website has compiled a list of all Methodist presidents from the 1932 deed of union to 2000, and the My Primitive Methodist Ancestors site has collated the list for the Primitive Methodist presidents from their first conference up to union of 1932. The gap in the Wesleyan records is filled from entries in the Methodist Who's Who of 1912, and the Wesleyan Historical Society's Dictionary of Methodism.<ref>[http://www.wesleyhistoricalsociety.org.uk/dmbi/ Wesleyan Historical Society Dictionary of Methodism], accessed 2 September 2014</ref> The Methodist Church of Great Britain website had a list of presidents (and lay vice-presidents) from 2000 onwards. Additional information on twentieth century Presidents is provided by the Manchester University's Methodist Archives and Research Centre''.

1791–1819

1820–1932 Wesleyans and Primitives

(During the early years of the Primitives' conference the presidents were not recorded, and may have been elected for each day of the conference. A later record indicates that amongst those serving as Primitive Methodist presidents before 1849, there were, in addition to those listed below, Hugh Bourne, William Garner, Thomas Bateman, Joseph Bailey, George Tetley, Sampson Turner.)

Post–1932 
In 1932 each denomination held a conference which elected their own interim presidents, followed a few months later by a unified conference at which a new president and lay vice-president were elected.

See also

Minister (Christianity)
Wesleyan Methodist Church (Great Britain)

References

External links 
A Dictionary of Methodism in Britain and Ireland DMBI online
 The Methodist Archives Biographical Index The University of Manchester Library
The Methodist Conference website

Methodism